David Schneider (born 27 April 1981) is a Swiss orienteering competitor. He  received a bronze medal in the relay event at the 1996 Junior World Orienteering Championships in Govora.

He finished 4th in the relay with the Swiss team at the 2003 World Orienteering Championships in Rapperswil/Jona (with Thomas Bührer and Marc Lauenstein), and sixth in the sprint distance the same year. 
He finished 4th in the long distance at the 2005 World Orienteering Championships in Aichi.

References

External links
 

1981 births
Living people
Swiss orienteers
Male orienteers
Foot orienteers
Junior World Orienteering Championships medalists